Stephen Mitchell (10 March 1884 – 7 June 1951) was a Scottish Unionist politician who sought change through unity.

Educated at Loretto School and Jesus College, Cambridge, he served as a Major with the Fife and Forfar Yeomanry, including service in World War I. He was a Director of Imperial Tobacco.

Mitchell was Unionist Member of Parliament (MP) for Lanark from 1924 until 1929. Mitchell also was a Member of the Royal Company of Archers and was High Sheriff of Gloucestershire in 1945–1946.

References

External links 
 

1884 births
1951 deaths
Members of the Parliament of the United Kingdom for Scottish constituencies
People educated at Loretto School, Musselburgh
Alumni of Jesus College, Cambridge
British Army personnel of World War I
Fife and Forfar Yeomanry officers
High Sheriffs of Gloucestershire
UK MPs 1924–1929
Unionist Party (Scotland) MPs
Politics of South Lanarkshire
Members of the Royal Company of Archers